I Am Sam is the debut EP by Korean-American singer-songwriter Sam Kim.

The songs "Mama Don't Worry", "Seattle" and "Your Song" were released as the digital pre-release EP My Name Is Sam on March 28, 2016.
The full-length EP, with the single "No Sense", was released digitally on April 10, 2016 and physically on April 11, 2016 through Antenna Music.

Promotion 
A music documentary, directed as a collaboration between Uranium238 and Teo Film Post, was produced as a tie-in with My Name Is Sam. It follows You Hee-yeol accompanying Kim on a visit to the United States for a showcase at the Blue Whale Jazz Club in Los Angeles and a surprise reunion with Kim's family.
The documentary was released as three episodes, named "Mama Don't Worry", "Seattle" and "Your Song", on Antenna's V Live and Naver TV channels between March 18–26.
A music video for "Mama Don't Worry", featuring clips from the documentary, was released along with My Name Is Sam on March 28.

I Am Sams lead single, "No Sense", was premiered with a live televised performance at the K-pop Star 5 finale on June 10, 2016. The music video for the single, along with the full-length EP, was released on digital platforms that same day.
"No Sense" was further promoted with a month of music show appearances. In addition to Crush, several guest rappers including  Loco, Yezi, Hanhae and Lil Boi joined Kim on stage at various performances.

A music video for "Seattle", featuring Lee Jin-ah, was released on November 5, 2016.

Track listing
Credits adapted from Antenna Music website.

Personnel
Credits for I Am Sam, adapted from Antenna Music website.Musicians Sam Kim – vocals, acoustic guitar , background vocals , rhythm programming 
 Choi Hoon – bass 
 Choi In-sung – bass 
 Crush – vocals , background vocals 
 Jung Seung-hwan – vocals 
 Kim Seung-ho – drums 
 Kwon Jin-ah – vocals 
 L.A. String Ensemble – strings 
 Lee Jin-ah – vocals , electric piano , piano 
 Park In-young – string arrangement and conducting 
 Philtre – synth , programming 
 Shin Seok-cheol – drums 
 Soulman – background vocals 
 Yang Jae-in – electric guitar 
 Yoo Hee-yeol – producer, rhythm programming , synth 
 Yun Seok-cheol – electric piano Studio engineers'
 Ji Seung-nam – recording engineer, mixing engineer
 Kwak Jung-shin – recording engineer
 Jung Mo-yeon – recording assistant
 Eun Hyun-ho – recording engineer
 Jeff Gartenbaum – recording engineer
 Billy Centenaro – recording assistant
 Jiyoung Shin – mixing assistant
 Tom Coyne – mastering

Chart performance

Release history

Notes

References

2016 debut EPs
Sam Kim albums
Genie Music EPs